Petru Ojog (born 17 July 1990) is a Moldovan footballer who plays as a midfielder for Moldovan National Division club Sfântul Gheorghe.

References

External links

1990 births
Moldovan footballers
Living people
Association football midfielders
Moldovan Super Liga players
FC Sfîntul Gheorghe players
FC Academia Chișinău players
FC Iskra-Stal players
FC Costuleni players
FC Spicul Chișcăreni players